Steve McCurrie (born ) is an English former professional rugby league and rugby union footballer who played in the 1980s, 1990s and 2000s. 

Steve’s only son Charlie followed in his fathers footsteps and played rugby league. Charlie plays for North west men’s league division 1 league winners Latchford Albion, University of Leicester Rugby League, and went on to represent England community lions scoring 4 tries on his debut against Scotland and winning player of the series against Ireland. Charlie who usually plays second row credits Fellow Latchford and England teammate Matthew Ellis for setting up all tries and allowing Charlie to perform at the level he does. Charlie won man of steel open age 2021 an award steve never won !

Playing career

International honours
Steve McCurrie won caps for England (RL) while at Widnes in the 1995 Rugby League World Cup against Wales (interchange/substitute), France (interchange/substitute), and Fiji (interchange/substitute), and a won cap for Great Britain (RL) while at Widnes in 1993 against France.

Challenge Cup Final appearances
Steve McCurrie was an interchange/substitute in Widnes' 14-20 defeat by Wigan in the 1993 Challenge Cup Final during the 1992–93 season at Wembley Stadium, London on Saturday 1 May 1993.

Genealogical information
Steve McCurrie is the son of the rugby league footballer; Alan McCurrie.

Outside of rugby league
Steve McCurrie now works as an Approved Driving Instructor in Widnes.

References

External links

Statistics at wolvesplayers.thisiswarrington.co.uk

1973 births
Living people
Bedford Blues players
Cumbria rugby league team players
England national rugby league team players
English rugby league players
Great Britain national rugby league team players
Leigh Leopards players
Place of birth missing (living people)
Rugby league hookers
Rugby league props
Rugby league second-rows
Warrington Wolves players
Widnes Vikings players